The Zbrašov Aragonite Caves are a national nature monument in Teplice nad Bečvou in the Olomouc Region, Czech Republic. The main subject of protection are important hydrothermal karst areas of Europe. They include the aragonite caves as well as the surrounding forests. Discovered in 1912 and opened for the public in 1926, the caves were created by both surface water and underground mineral water springs rich in carbon dioxide that are used in spas in the nearby village and spa resort of Teplice nad Bečvou.

The caves are filled with formations of stalagmite and aragonite that resemble geysers and doughnuts, and the bottom levels of the cave are filled with carbon dioxide. The temperature stays around  throughout the year, and the caves are the warmest underground places in the Czech Republic.

Location 

The caves are located across the Bečva River under the National Nature Reserve at Hůrka. It is part of large karst area that also includes the Hranická gap, which is the deepest hole in the Czech Republic.

Much of the surface territory is from 16th century and included the spa complex, which was gradually modified into a semi-natural urban park whose technical facilities (rest areas, roads, rail) are currently in a neglected state.

Also situated in the area are buildings built for various purposes. They include a small chapel of Saint Peregrine, the Kropáčová public spring fountain, the villa of Ladislav Říhovský (a cultural monument of the Czech Republic) and other buildings. Some undesirable effects due to buildings constructed in and around the NPP are from utility lines that often cause dangerous accidents in the karst area.

Many of the buildings in the area threaten the karst system. Work is in progress to connect them to a sewerage system and remove all the septic tanks and cess pools.

In the Czech Republic, there are so far nearly 4000 known caves. All of caves are protected under Act No. 114/1992 Sb. on the protection of nature and landscape. The Zbrašov Aragonite Caves are among the 14 caves open to the public.

History 

In December 1912, workers at a local quarry uncovered a crack in the rocks with warm air coming out. Brothers Josef and Chrome Čeněk were interested in the karst formations in the area and so they made the opening bigger, and in January 1913, climbed down a rope  into the dark underground space. The rope broke and both men were trapped in the cave. Their carbide lamps were also broken in the fall, so the explorers had to wait eight hours in the dark to be rescued. Over the next few years, explorers and other members of the local volunteer miners spent their free time exploring many other parts of the  cave system. A new, more convenient entrance from the Bečva valley was dug and electric lighting was introduced. In 1926, the cave was made open to the public.

From 2002 to 2005, the cave paths and wiring were renovated. In addition, a large amount of rock debris was removed, which had filled some natural cavities and hallways. This material had been created at the time of the original entry works and for economic reasons had not been carried out of the caves. During this renovation some parts of the system were returned to their original form.

Natural features

Geology 

The geology of the area is made up of large blocks of rock. Valleys are short and form along the fault lines between these blocks. This is covered with a younger layer of Miocene sediments.

According to the geomorphological structure of the Czech Republic these small-scale specially protected territories are a part of the Maleník section of the Silesian-Moravian Foothills. Maleník is a rugged highland composed of culm greywacke, sandstones and shales, Devonian limestones and Miocene sediments. The highland is characterized as a cutting horst dipping to the SE with internal block structure. Valleys are short, mostly based on fault lines.

The caves developed from two completely different karst processes. The first was solution by surface water that entered the rock through cracks in the limestone and created large underground spaces. The aragonite and calcite in the cave is formed mainly by calcium carbonate. This can crystallize in three ways. The first is the mineral calcite, which is the most common and consists of cave fillings, such as stalactites, stalagmites, sinter deposits and valances. There are geyser stalagmites that are conical in shape and several tens of centimeters high. These are not found anywhere else in the world. The second type of calcium carbonite is aragonite. This forms white needle-like crystals. Water and carbon dioxide are released. Vaterite, the third and rarest form of calcium carbonate is not present.

Hydrology 

The area is drained by the Bečva, which flows into the Morava. When durable and heavy rainfall raises the water level it can cause the river to overflow, and flood the caves. The most devastating floods in Moravia occurred in 1997 from July 5 to 16. The flood waters entered the cave and into the last dry space (Marble Hall). This raised the levels of mineral pools and led to a gas increase in higher ground caves. Increased carbon dioxide concentration in the visitor route was solved by installing a special suction device that keeps the composition of the air at the values established by the State Mining Administration (up to 1% carbon dioxide). Extraordinary hydrological situation also led to disruption of technical equipment, but without damaging the caves preserved state.

Mineral water features in the spas in the two springs and spring Kropác - RI borehole from a depth of 60.4 meters, which is heavily mineralized, carbonic thermal lukewarm, hypotonic mineral water, bicarbonate-calcium type and Jurikův source - borehole from RIII depth of 101.8 m, which is heavily mineralized mineral water, carbonated, thermal lukewarm, hypotonic, bicarbonate-calcium type. Carbon dioxide content in the water is up to 3292 mg / l mineral water average temperature is 22.5 °C. The Teplice nad Bečvou Spa is the mineral water used for spa treatments rehabilitative care in oncology diseases, circulatory system diseases, disorders of metabolism and endocrine glands.

Climate 
The climate is moderately warm - climate region MT10 (Quittová classification), which is characterized by long summers, warm and slightly dry, short transition period with slightly warm spring and slightly warm autumn, winter short, slightly warm and very dry, with a short duration snow cover. Annually, there falls an average of 700 mm of precipitation and average annual air temperature is 7 °C. Snow cover there lies an average of 50–60 days per year.

Microclimate 

The karst process results in a unique microclimate of caves, characterized mainly by springs and carbon dioxide in the lower parts of the cave area, creating gas reservoirs. Some of the lower part of the caves are filled with carbon dioxide permanently. The concentration of carbon dioxide in the cave commonly reaches 40% by volume; more than 8–10% is fatal to humans. An integral part of the security measures, therefore, is the daily measurement of carbon dioxide and adapting workers and visitors to the current situation.

The carbon dioxide originates from a great depth about 40 km below the surface. Carbon dioxide leaves the depth along the deep faults towards the surface, either forming the dry gas in mofettas or dissolving in mineral water.

Caves are the warmest in the Czech Republic, with year-round temperature of 14 °C. The relative humidity is about 98%.

Soil science 
In the area there are mesotrophic to eutrophic brown soils, calcareous brown soils, steep slopes, rocky outcrops near undeveloped land, and brown rankers.

Flora 
The surface of the protected area is mostly forest canopy cover, which has a near-natural tree composition. There is growing mixed forest consisting of winter oak (Quercus petraea), beech (Fagus sylvatica), common hornbeam (Carpinus betulus), sycamore (Acer pseudoplatanus), spruce ash (Fraxinus excelsior), maple (Acer platanoides), small-leaved lime (Tilia cordata), sometimes Norway spruce (Picea abies) and silver fir (Abies alba). Occasionally there are a few mountain elms (Ulmus glabra).

In the past, these forests were negatively affected by forest management, such as logging and the subsequent planting in favor of spruce trees. In the future, these negative effects will prevent growth of special purpose forests; other important interests require a different way of farming.

The local specific environment creates favorable conditions for the existence and development of a number of endangered plant species. The major species found there are: polypod (Polypodium interjectum) – highly endangered C2 species, Martagon lily (Lilium martagon) – C4 species requiring attention, hairy brome (Bromus ramosus) – endangered C3 species, and the bright chervil (Anthriscus nitida).

For non-native tree species, they are currently found with the black locust (Robinia pseudoacacia), and need to be continuously cut down. Acacia has a strong tendency to spread and produces chemical substances that suppresses the growth of native plants, which are then replaced by nitrophilous types, such as stinging nettle (Urtica dioica), which degrades the area. Furthermore, knotweed (Reynoutria) occurs there and spreads rapidly, displacing native species and acidifying the soil. It is removed several times a year using glyphosate herbicides.

In the caves, bioluminescence is produced in place of permanent lighting. These are growths of algae and mosses, mainly Bryum capillary, Eucladium verticillatum, creeping feather moss (Amblystegium serpens), Brachythecium rutabulum, Brachythecium velutinum, Fissidens taxifolius, and Leptobryum pyriforme. Bioluminescence is an undesirable phenomenon due to secondary damage to karst formations. Its occurrence is limited by specific management such as spraying of sodium hypochlorite and changing lighting techniques.

Fauna 
There are few flying animals at the Aragonite caves due to high temperatures year-round, but occasionally there are lesser horseshoe bats (Rhinolophus hipposideros) - critically endangered C1 species C1, common pipistrelle (Pipistrellus pipistrellus) – highly endangered C2 species, the soprano pipistrelle (Pipistrellus pygmaeus) – highly endangered C2 species, and the serotine bat (Eptesicus serotinus) – highly endangered C2 species.

Other specially protected species that live in the caves are the slowworm (Anguis fragilis), grass snake (Natrix natrix), sand lizard (Lacerta agilis), dormouse (Glis glis), sparrowhawk (Accipiter nisus), and the collared flycatcher (Ficedula albicollis). For several groups of invertebrates that have been studied, among the most interesting are millipedes (Diplopoda), especially species Brachychaeteuma bradae and Geoglomeris subterranea who were first discovered in the Czech Republic at this location. Androniscus dentiger woodlouse are found in the cave system.

Protection 
Until 1991 the cave was managed by Homeland Regional Institute in Olomouc. Since 1991 the caves have been under the administration of Nature and Landscape Protection Agency of the Czech Republic and since 2006 also the Cave Administration of the Czech Republic, organizations of the Ministry of the Environment of the Czech Republic.

A big problem is damage done to the aragonite by organisms on textile fibers that are carried from the clothing of passing visitors. The organisms cause discoloration of white aragonite needles and their subsequent decay, but there are possible solutions to address the problem. Other negative impacts on karst decoration attendance are: foreign substances released by breathing, olamování decorations, the release of dust, hair, textile fibers and the temperature increase air caused by the body temperature of visitors. It is necessary to maintain visitor order and a limited number of visitors in groups. Algae and moss have grown in places with permanent lighting near the visitor routes. These growths are removed twice a year using a solution of sodium hypochlorite.

Tourism 
The route made available to the public is a 375 m long (1322 m of known tunnels) tunnel, and the cave tour lasts 50 minutes. 60,000 people visit the caves each year.

Cave tours begins in a space named the Boardroom. It is named after the sharp rock in the middle, which commemorates the lectern. Furthermore, a circle goes around the geyser stalagmites, which is for an illustrative, installed longitudinal section of this unit. Another small nook called U Antonícka, resembles a small stone ledge-like figure. The following is a totally unique Koblihová hall. Doughnut formations on the walls formed from the deposition of layers of pure calcite mixed with oxides of iron. The next stop that awaits visitors is the cathedral Gallas, named after the writer and native Hranice JHA Gallas, who lived between from 1756 to 1840. Around the waterfall, spaces with classic stalactite formations, continues to tour pools. Additional space is called Jurikův Dome and is located in the rock wall covered with bushes called an aragonite curtain. Around the Turkish cemetery with geyser stalagmites, visitors can go through to the last space, the Marble Hall, which is used for exhibitions and chamber music concerts.

References

Further reading
Baier, Johannes (2021): Die Zbraschauer Aragonithöhle in Mähren. - In: Fossilien 38(3): 47–54.

External links 
 Official web of the Zbrašov Aragonite Caves
 Official facebook of the Zbrašov Aragonite Caves
 Virtual tour of the Zbrašov Aragonite Caves

Protected areas of the Czech Republic
Caves of the Czech Republic
Show caves in the Czech Republic
Přerov District
Show caves